Cyrielle Peltier (born 30 March 1992 in Le Mans) is a professional squash player who represents France. She reached a career-high world ranking of World No. 51 in November 2015.

References

External links 

French female squash players
Living people
1992 births
Sportspeople from Le Mans
21st-century French women